Nanluoguxiang is a narrow alley that gives its name to an old part of the Beijing city centre with traditional architecture both new and old. The neighborhood contains many typical narrow streets known as hutong. It is located in the Dongcheng district.

The alley itself is approximately 800m long, running from East Gulou Street in the north to Di'anmen East Street in the south.

History
Nanluoguxiang was built in the Yuan Dynasty and received its current name during the Qing Dynasty, around 1750. In recent years, the area's hutongs have become a popular tourist destination with restaurants, bars, live music houses, coffee shops, fast food and souvenir shops, as well as some old siheyuan associated with famous historic and literary figures. Nanluoguxiang Station of Beijing Subway opened in 2012 and is located near the south entrance of the alley.

Gallery

See also
Nanluoguxiang Station

References

Streets in Beijing
Dongcheng District, Beijing